Strange Form of Life is the name of a Bonnie 'Prince' Billy EP, whose title track is taken from the 2006 album The Letting Go. The remainder of the EP comes from a Daytrotter session recorded by Will Oldham in August 2006. The EP is available on 12" vinyl, and an Enhanced CD, which includes the music video for the title track, directed by Jennifer Parsons.

Track listing
"Strange Form of Life" – 3:44
"New Partner" – 3:49
"The Sun Highlights the Lack in Each" – 4:24
"The Seedling" – 3:56

2007 EPs
Will Oldham albums
Drag City (record label) EPs